La vuelta de Rocha is a 1937  Argentine film directed and written by Manuel Romero.

Cast
Ángel Magaña
Enrique Muiño
Elías Alippi
Rosa Contreras
Mercedes Simone

External links

1937 films
1930s Spanish-language films
Argentine black-and-white films
Films directed by Manuel Romero
Argentine musical drama films
1930s musical drama films
1937 drama films
1930s Argentine films